Admiral Nicholson may refer to:

Douglas Nicholson (1867–1946), British Royal Navy admiral
Gresham Nicholson (1892–1975), British Royal Navy admiral
Henry Nicholson (Royal Navy officer) (1835–1914), British Royal Navy admiral
James W. Nicholson (1821–1887), U.S. Navy rear admiral
Reginald F. Nicholson (1852–1939), U.S. Navy rear admiral
William Nicholson (Royal Navy officer) (1863–1932), British Royal Navy admiral
Wilmot Nicholson (1872–1947), British Royal Navy admiral

See also
John B. Nicolson  (1783–1846), U.S. Navy commodore, equivalent rank during this era